Telemundo Puerto Rico may refer to:

 Telemundo Puerto Rico (TV channel)
 WKAQ-TV, a Telemundo station in San Juan, Puerto Rico